Alexander Kwabena Baidoo Djiku (born 9 August 1994) is a professional footballer who plays as a defender for Ligue 1 club Strasbourg. Born in Montpellier, France, he represents the Ghana national team.

Club career
Djiku spent his youth career at Bastia. He played for the reserve team until 2014, when he was promoted to the senior team. Djiku made his debut in a Coupe de la Ligue match against Évian in December 2013.

On 11 July 2017, Djiku joined Ligue 1 side Caen on a four-year contract. He was acquired by fellow Ligue 1 club Strasbourg in July 2019, signing a four-year contract.

International career
Djiku is of Ghanaian Ewe and French descent. He debuted with the senior Ghana national team in a 3–0 friendly loss to Mali on 9 October 2020. He played his second match for Ghana against Qatar on 12 October 2020 in which he impressed. Djiku's third match came when he was given the opportunity by the Black Stars new head coach to start against Zimbabwe in a World Cup qualifier where Ghana won 3–1. He was part of Ghana's team at the 2021 African Cup of Nations in Cameroon.

Personal life 
Djiku is married to Heley Djiku. The couple have two children, Wesley and Elyana.

Career statistics

Club

Honours 
Bastia

 Coupe de la Ligue runner-up: 2014–15

Individual
 Ghana Football Awards Footballer of the Year: 2022
 Ghana Football Awards Foreign-based Footballer of the Year: 2022

References

External links
 
 

1994 births
Living people
Footballers from Montpellier
Association football defenders
Citizens of Ghana through descent
Ghanaian footballers
Ghana international footballers
French footballers
Ghanaian people of French descent
French sportspeople of Ghanaian descent
Ligue 1 players
SC Bastia players
Stade Malherbe Caen players
RC Strasbourg Alsace players
2021 Africa Cup of Nations players
2022 FIFA World Cup players